DWDU (105.5 FM), broadcasting as UFM 105.5, is a radio station owned and operated by Reliance Broadcasting Unlimited (formerly Information Broadcast Unlimited). The station's studio is located at the Comclark Bldg., Manuel A. Roxas Highway, Clark Freeport Zone, and its transmitter is located at Clark FM Hill, Clark Freeport Zone. The station broadcasts daily from 5:00 AM to 10:00 PM.

It began operations in 2012 as D'Ultimate, with a mass-based format. In 2015, it rebranded to its current brand and switched to a Top 40 format. In 2018, it changed its format to Adult hits.

References

External links
Official Website

Radio stations in Angeles City
Radio stations established in 2012